Tingvollfjorden is a fjord in Møre og Romsdal county, Norway. The inner part of the fjord (within the municipality of Sunndal) is called the Sunndalsfjorden. The river Driva flows into the fjord at its end. Villages along the fjord include Torvikbukt, Flemma, Angvika, Tingvollvågen, Rausand, Jordalsgrenda, Øksendalsøra, Hoem, and Sunndalsøra.

See also
 List of Norwegian fjords

References

Fjords of Møre og Romsdal
Gjemnes
Tingvoll
Molde
Sunndal